Randal Allen Mihailoff (born July 31, 1956) is an American actor and former professional wrestler.

Career
Mihailoff's first role was in the 1980 science fiction film The Lathe of Heaven. He is best known for portraying Leatherface in the film Leatherface: The Texas Chainsaw Massacre III, the third in The Texas Chain Saw Massacre series of movies.

Paranormal group

In his free time, Mihailoff has ghost hunted in a paranormal group called the Hollywood Ghost Hunters. It is a "group of people who normally make a living by trying to scare other people. Everybody in the group has something to do with horror movies." The group was founded by Kane "Jason" Hodder, who played the lead role of Jason Voorhees in the Friday the 13th series, and his partner Rick "Stuntman" McCullum, a Hollywood stuntman and actor who doubles for horror film actors like Sid Haig. They formed the team after filming Fallen Angels at Mansfield Reformatory, where they claim to have had a paranormal experience in one of the cell blocks.

On January 7, 2011, Hollywood Ghost Hunters was featured on the "Pico House" episode of Travel Channel's Ghost Adventures.

Filmography

References

External links
 
 

Male actors from Maine
American male film actors
American male television actors
Living people
Sportspeople from Augusta, Maine
20th-century American male actors
People from Crawford County, Pennsylvania
21st-century American male actors
1956 births